Apostolos "Akis" Mantzios (born 21 October 1969) is a Greek professional football manager and former player, who is the current manager of Super League club Asteras Tripolis.

Playing career
When he was 22 years, he went to Panionios from AO Kifissia. Soon he won a place in the starting lineup of his new club, where he remained for 8 consecutive years. Mantzios won the Greek Football Cup with Panionios in 1998. In the summer of 1998, he moved to Aris and two years later he moved to Ionikos. In the summer of  2001, he returned to Panionios, where he ended his career two years later.

Career statistics

Managerial career
As of 4 March 2022

He started his managerial career from the youth teams of Panionios. At the season 2008–09, he became the manager of AO Haidari. The following year, he returned to Panionios, as a member of the coaching team. In January 2011, he became the coach of Thrasyvoulos. During the season 2011–12, he was the coach of Panionios  and the next season the coach of Kerkyra.

Honours

As a player
Panionios
Greek Cup: 1998

References

External links
statistics in rsssf

Panionios F.C. players
Aris Thessaloniki F.C. players
Super League Greece players
Greek footballers
1969 births
Living people
Association football defenders
Ionikos F.C. players
Greek football managers
Panionios F.C. managers
Apollon Smyrnis F.C. managers
People from Konitsa
A.O. Kerkyra managers
Footballers from Epirus (region)